Thirty Million Letters is a 1963 short documentary film directed by James Ritchie and made by British Transport Films. It was nominated for an Academy Award for Best Documentary Short.

References

External links

    

1963 films
1963 documentary films
1963 short films
1960s short documentary films
British short documentary films
British Transport Films
1960s English-language films
1960s British films